The Strand Theatre is a multi-use performing arts and film center in Marietta, Georgia, United States. Originally built in 1935 by the Manning-Winks Theatre Company as an art deco movie palace, it is currently the home of the Earl and Rachel Smith Strand Theatre, a nonprofit arts organization specializing in live theatre, classic movies, concerts, comedy, and other special events.

The theatre closed in 1976, and was re-opened in 2008 as a result of the efforts of the Friends of The Strand, Inc. On October 17, 2017, Earl Smith announced a donation of $500,000 towards the capital campaign in his late wife's name. The theatre was renamed the Earl and Rachel Smith Strand Theatre in her honor.

References

External links 
 The Strand Theatre
 Photograph of the Strand in 1964
 Strand and surroundings ca. 1950

Buildings and structures in Marietta, Georgia
Theatres in Georgia (U.S. state)
Theatres in Atlanta
Theatres completed in 1935
Tourist attractions in Cobb County, Georgia
Music venues in Georgia (U.S. state)
Cinemas and movie theaters in Georgia (U.S. state)
Concert halls in the United States
Public venues with a theatre organ
Movie palaces
Nonprofit institutes based in the United States
Performing arts centers in Georgia (U.S. state)